The Winx Guineas, registered as the Sunshine Coast Guineas is a Sunshine Coast Turf Club Group 3 Thoroughbred horse race for three-year-olds, under set weights conditions, over a distance of 1600 metres at Corbould Park Racecourse, Caloundra, Queensland, Australia during the Queensland Winter Racing Carnival. Total prize money for the race is A$200,000.

History
In 2015 the event was held earlier than the usual late June or early July timing during the Queensland Winter Racing Carnival.

In 2020 the race was renamed the Winx Guineas, in honour of Australian Racing Hall of Fame horse Winx who won the race in 2015, that began a 33 race winning streak.

Grade
2006–2013 - Listed race
2014 onwards - Group 3

Distance
2005 – 1560 metres

Winners

 2022 - Majestic Colour
2021 - Our Playboy
2020 - Wapiti
2019 - Baccarat Baby
2018 - The Bostonian
2017 - Crack Me Up
2016 - Tivaci
2015 - Winx
2014 - Hopfgarten
2013 - Eximius
2012 - Tuskegee Hawk 
2011 - Shenzhou Steeds 
2010 - Fifteen Carat 
2009 - Za Magic 
2008 - Sam's Express 
2007 - Maslins Beach 
2006 - Diamondsondinside 
2005 - Atapi 
2004 - Au Chocolat 
2003 - Paper Kings 
2002 - Smart Chariot 
2001 - Amaizcay 
2000 - Sunset

See also
 List of Australian Group races
 Group races

References

Horse races in Australia
Flat horse races for three-year-olds
Recurring sporting events established in 2000
2000 establishments in Australia